Hon. Emmett Harmon of Liberia served as a member of the World Scout Committee.
In 1975, Harmon was awarded the 99th Bronze Wolf, the only distinction of the World Organization of the Scout Movement, awarded by the World Scout Committee for exceptional services to world Scouting, at the 25th World Scout Conference.

References

External links

Recipients of the Bronze Wolf Award
Year of birth missing
Scouting and Guiding in Liberia
World Scout Committee members